Lintonia is a genus of African plants in the grass family.

 Species
 Lintonia brizoides (Chiov.) C.E.Hubb. - Kenya, Ethiopia
 Lintonia nutans Stapf - Kenya, Ethiopia, Somalia, Sudan, South Sudan, Tanzania, Uganda, Mozambique, Zimbabwe, Botswana, Limpopo, Mpumalanga, Eswatini, KwaZulu-Natal

References

Poaceae genera
Grasses of Africa
Chloridoideae